Ivan Ferák (born 18 December 1941) is a Slovak former swimmer. He competed in the men's 200 metre backstroke at the 1964 Summer Olympics.

References

1941 births
Living people
Slovak male swimmers
Olympic swimmers of Czechoslovakia
Swimmers at the 1964 Summer Olympics
Sportspeople from Bratislava